Harold Robbins (May 21, 1916 – October 14, 1997) was an American author of popular novels. One of the best-selling writers of all time, he wrote over 25 best-sellers, selling over 750 million copies in 32 languages.

Early life
Robbins was born Harold Rubin in New York City in 1916, the son of Frances "Fannie" Smith and Charles Rubin. His parents were well-educated Jewish emigrants from the Russian Empire, his father from Odessa and his mother from Neshwies (Nyasvizh), south of Minsk. Robbins later falsely claimed to be a Jewish orphan who had been raised in a Catholic boys' home. Instead he was raised by his father, a pharmacist, and his stepmother, Blanche, in Brooklyn.

Robbins dropped out of high school in the late 1920s to work in a variety of jobs, including errand boy, bookies' runner, and inventory clerk in a grocers. He was employed by Universal Pictures from 1940 to 1957, starting off as a clerk and rising to an executive.

Work
His first book was Never Love a Stranger (1948). The Dream Merchants (1949) was a novel about the American film industry, from its beginning to the sound era in which Robbins blended his own life experiences with history, melodrama, sex, and glossy high society into a fast-moving story. His 1952 novel, A Stone for Danny Fisher, was adapted into a 1958 motion picture King Creole, which starred Elvis Presley.

Among his best-known books is The Carpetbaggers – featuring a protagonist who was a loose composite of Howard Hughes, Bill Lear, Harry Cohn, and Louis B. Mayer. The Carpetbaggers takes the reader from New York to California, from the prosperity of the aeronautical industry to the glamor of Hollywood. Its sequel, The Raiders, was released in 1995.

After The Carpetbaggers and Where Love Has Gone (1962) came The Adventurers (1966), based on Robbins's experiences living in South America, including three months spent in the mountains of Colombia with a group of bandits. The book was adapted into a film in 1970, also titled The Adventurers. He created the ABC television series The Survivors (1969-1970), starring Ralph Bellamy and Lana Turner.

Robbins' editors included Cynthia White and Michael Korda and his literary agent was Paul Gitlin.

In July 1989, Robbins was involved in a literary controversy when the trade periodical Publishers Weekly revealed that around four pages from Robbins' novel The Pirate (1974) had been lifted without permission and integrated into Kathy Acker's novel The Adult Life of Toulouse Lautrec (1975), which had recently been re-published in the UK in a selection of early works by Acker titled Young Lust (1989). After Paul Gitlin saw the exposé in Publishers Weekly, he informed Robbins' UK publisher, Hodder & Stoughton, who requested that Acker's publisher Unwin Hyman withdraw and pulp Young Lust. Representatives for the novelist explained that Acker was well known for her deliberate use of literary appropriation—or bricolage, a postmodern technique akin to plagiarism in which fragments of pre-existing works are combined along with original writings to create new literary works. After an intervention by William S. Burroughs—a novelist who used appropriation in his own works of the 1960s—Robbins issued a statement to give Acker retroactive permission to appropriate from his work, avoiding legal action on his publisher's part.

Since his death, several new books have been published, written by ghostwriters and based on Robbins's own notes and unfinished stories. In several of these books, Junius Podrug has been credited as co-writer.

From the Hodder & Stoughton 2008 edition of The Carpetbaggers "about the author" section:

In popular culture 
Robbins is mentioned by name in Star Trek IV: The Voyage Home by Admiral James T. Kirk; his first officer Spock mentions that Robbins was one of the 20th century "giants" of literature. Robbins is also mentioned by name by Basil Fawlty in the Fawlty Towers episode "Waldorf Salad"; he refers to Robbins' work as "transatlantic tripe". The band Squeeze mentions "a Harold Robbins paperback" in their song "Pulling Mussels (From The Shell)".  In Roger Corman's 1970 post-apocalyptic Gas! -Or- It Became Necessary to Destroy the World in Order to Save It., a young couple uses a public library's copies of the collected works of Jacqueline Susann (who took inspiration from Robbins in writing her first novel in Valley of the Dolls) as kindling after the woman's initial objection to burning library books to keep warm.  She says, "OK, but what if we run out?" Her boyfriend says, "Don't worry, there's an entire shelf full of Harold Robbins." In the movie Educating Rita, Dr Bryant, played by Michael Caine said he doubts that the examiner of the English Literature course has read Where Love Has Gone.

Personal life
Robbins was married three times, first to his high school sweetheart, Lillian Machnivitz. In 1965 he wed Grace Palermo, who went on to pen an account of her life with Robbins in 2013. Divorced in the early 1990s, Robbins married Jann Stapp in 1992; they remained together until his death.

He spent a great deal of time on the French Riviera and at Monte Carlo until his death from respiratory heart failure, at the age of 81 in Palm Springs, California. His cremated remains are interred at Forest Lawn Cemetery in Cathedral City. Robbins has a star on the Hollywood Walk of Fame at 6743 Hollywood Boulevard.

Novels

 Never Love a Stranger, 1948 (made into the 1958 film)
 The Dream Merchants, 1949 (made into a 1980 TV miniseries)
 A Stone for Danny Fisher, 1952 (made into the 1958 film King Creole)
 Never Leave Me, 1953
 79 Park Avenue, 1955 (made into the 1977 TV miniseries)
 Stiletto, 1960 (made into the 1969 film)
 The Carpetbaggers, 1961 (made into both the 1964 film of the same name and the 1966 film Nevada Smith)
 Where Love Has Gone, 1962 (made into the 1964 film)
 The Adventurers, 1966 (made into the 1970 film)
 The Inheritors, 1969
 The Betsy, 1971 (made into the 1978 film)
 The Pirate, 1974 (made into  the 1978 TV movie)
 The Lonely Lady, 1976 (made into the 1983 film)
 Dreams Die First, 1977
 Memories of Another Day, 1979
 Goodbye, Janette, 1981
 The Storyteller, 1982
 Spellbinder, 1982
 Descent from Xanadu, 1984
 The Piranhas, 1986
 The Raiders, 1995 (sequel to The Carpetbaggers)
 The Stallion, 1996 (sequel to The Betsy)
 Tycoon, 1997

Posthumously published novels credited to Robbins
Works bearing Robbins name continued to appear after his death.  The earliest three posthumous Harold Robbins novels (The Predators (1998), The Secret (2000) and Never Enough (2001) are generally thought to have been completed by ghostwriters, but may have been partially or even substantially based on completed work or notes written by Robbins.  Junius Podrug has been identified as the uncredited ghostwriter of Sin City (2002) and Heat of Passion (2003).  From 2004-2011, a series of novels credited to Harold Robbins and Junius Podrug appeared, although they are strictly the work of Podrug, writing in Robbins' style.

 The Predators, 1998
 The Secret, 2000 (sequel to The Predators)
 Never Enough, 2001
 Sin City, 2002
 Heat of Passion, 2003
 The Betrayers (with Junius Podrug), 2004
 Blood Royal (with Junius Podrug), 2005
 The Devil to Pay (with Junius Podrug), 2006
 The Looters (with Junius Podrug), 2007, Madison Dupree No. 1
 The Deceivers (with Junius Podrug), 2008, Madison Dupree No. 2
 The Shroud (with Junius Podrug), 2009, Madison Dupree No. 3
 The Curse (with Junius Podrug), 2011, Madison Dupree No. 4

References

External links
 
 
 Harold Robbins Quotes

1916 births
1997 deaths
20th-century American novelists
American erotica writers
American male novelists
Burials at Forest Lawn Cemetery (Cathedral City)
Jewish American writers
Writers from New York City
Writers from Palm Springs, California
Deaths from respiratory failure
Novelists from New York (state)
Novelists from California
20th-century American male writers
20th-century American Jews